Marco Antonio Xicoténcatl Reynoso (born 21 January 1955) is a Mexican physician and politician affiliated with the National Action Party. He served as Senator of the LVIII and LIX Legislatures of the Mexican Congress representing Morelos, and previously served as a local deputy in the XLVII Legislature of the Congress of Morelos.

References

1955 births
Living people
People from Mexico City
20th-century Mexican physicians
21st-century Mexican politicians
Members of the Senate of the Republic (Mexico)
Members of the Congress of Morelos
National Action Party (Mexico) politicians
National Autonomous University of Mexico alumni
Universidad Autónoma del Estado de Morelos alumni
Academic staff of Universidad Autónoma del Estado de Morelos